Loyd may refer to:

Places

United States
 Loyd, Colorado
 Loyd, Illinois
 Loyd, Louisiana
 Loyd, Mississippi
 Loyd, Wisconsin, unincorporated community

People

Given name
 Loyd Auerbach, professor of parapsychology
 Loyd Blankenship (born 1965), American computer hacker and author
 Loyd Christopher (1919–1991), American Major League Baseball outfielder (Boston Red Sox)
 Loyd Colson (born 1947), American Major League Baseball pitcher
 Loyd Gentry, Jr. (born 1925), American horse trainer
 Loyd Grossman (born 1950), Anglo-American television presenter
 Loyd Jowers (1927–2000), American accused of involvement in Dr. Martin Luther King Jr.'s assassination
 Loyd Phillips (1945–2020), American football player
 Loyd Sigmon (1909–2004), American radio broadcaster
 Loyd Wheaton (1838–1918), United States general

Surname
 Anthony Loyd (born 1966), English journalist
 Arthur Loyd (1882–1944), English Conservative Party politician
 Brian Loyd (born 1973), American baseball player
 Casey Loyd (born 1989), American soccer player
 Charles Loyd (1891–1973), British Army general
 Jewell Loyd (born 1993), American basketball player
 Lewis Vivian Loyd (1852–1908), British politician
 Paul B. Loyd, Jr., American businessperson
 Robert Loyd-Lindsay, 1st Baron Wantage (1832–1901), British general
 Sam Loyd (1841–1911), American chess player
 Samuel Jones-Loyd, 1st Baron Overstone (1796–1883), British banker and politician
 Vivian Loyd, tank designer, with Sir John Carden, 6th Baronet
 Zach Loyd (born 1987), American soccer player

See also
 Lloyd (disambiguation)
 Loyd Carrier, small tracked war vehicle